{{DISPLAYTITLE:C20H28O3}}
The molecular formula C20H28O3 may refer to:

 Cafestol
 Enestebol
 Gestonorone
 Mytatrienediol
 Nandrolone acetate
 Pachyphyllone
 Petasin
 Taxodone
 Testosterone formate